CS Politehnica Iași is a professional basketball club, based in Iași, Romania. The club competes in the Liga Națională.

History
The club was founded in 1967 and the best performance of the white and blues was in the 1997-1998 season when they won the bronze medal in the Liga Națională. The team relegated at the end of the 2010-2011 season in the second league.

In the season 2016-2017 the team finally qualified for the Liga I final four, and in the final they managed to get the second place, which guaranteed their access to the 2017–18 Liga Națională.

Current roster

References

External links
  
 CS Politehnica Iași At Totalbaschet.ro
 CS Politehnica Iași At Eurobasket.com
 CS Politehnica Iași At BaschetRomania.ro

Basketball teams in Romania
Basketball teams established in 1967
1967 establishments in Romania
Sport in Iași